The Four Houses by Architect Frederick Schock are Queen Anne and Shingle styles houses located at 5749 & 5804 West Race Avenue and 5804 & 5810 West Midway Park in the Austin neighborhood of Chicago, Illinois, United States.  The houses were built between 1886 and 1892 by Frederick R. Schock. They were designated Chicago Landmarks on January 20, 1999.

References

1880s architecture in the United States
1890s architecture in the United States
Houses in Chicago
Chicago Landmarks